Clitoria guianensis  is a plant of the genus Clitoria native to Brazil.

References

External links
 
 

guianensis